The Pueblo Weisbrod Aircraft Museum is a non-profit aviation museum located in Southern Colorado. It was founded in the mid-1970s by former Pueblo City Manager Fred Weisbrod. The museum is made up of two hangars that were built in 2005 and 2011. The hangars house several of the museum's aircraft along with thousands of artifacts dating from World War I to modern day. PWAM is home to the International B-24 Memorial Museum and the Southern Colorado Space Museum and Learning Center. There are several historic military vehicles in the museum's collection, many of which are still in operational condition. The museum is located six miles east of Pueblo, Colorado on US Highway 50 at the Pueblo Memorial Airport, occupying space on what was the Pueblo Army Air Base during World War II. It is managed and maintained by the Pueblo Historical Aircraft Society.

The museum's collection includes around forty military and civilian aircraft, as well as several military vehicles. The museum hosts periodic open cockpit days and fly ins at the neighboring Pueblo Memorial Airport. PWAM houses an extensive collection of books and research material in the museum's library.  The museum is run by a volunteer staff of men and women who provide tours, run the gift shop and do aircraft restoration and maintenance.

History 
The museum was founded by a group of aviation enthusiasts in the 1980s. In 2008, the museum requested funding from the county for the building of an additional hangar.

Aircraft on display

Military aircraft 

 Beechcraft T-34 Mentor 144018
 Bell OH-13E Sioux
 Bell UH-1D Iroquois 72-21508
 Bell UH-1M Iroquois 65-9484
 Bell OH-58A Kiowa 69-16271
 Boeing-Stearman PT-13D Kaydet 75-5943
 Boeing B-29 Superfortress 44-62022
 Boeing NB-47E Stratojet 532104
 Boeing B-52F Stratofortress – nose section
 Cessna T-37B Tweet 67-22253
 Convair HC-131A Samaritan 5794
 Douglas R4D-5 17217
 Douglas A-26C Invader 44-35892
 Douglas F-6A Skyray 134936
 Douglas A-4C Skyhawk 147702
 Fairchild C-119 Flying Boxcar 131688
 General Dynamics F-16A Fighting Falcon 80-0499
 Grumman F9F-8 Cougar 138876
 Grumman F11F Tiger 141853
 Lockheed F-80C Shooting Star 49-1872
 Lockheed YF-104 Starfighter 55-2967
 Lockheed SP-2E Neptune 128402
 Lockheed TV-2 SeaStar 137936
 Lockheed C-130E Hercules – nose section 70-1259
 McDonnell Douglas F-15C Eagle 79-0022 – This aircraft shot down an Iraqi MiG-23 during Operation Desert Storm on 28 January 1991.
 McDonnell Douglas F-4D Phantom II – nose section and flight simulator
 North American F-86D Sabre 52-3653
 North American F-100D Super Sabre 55-3503
 North American T-28C Trojan 140064
 North American RA-5C Vigilante 151629
 Piasecki CH-21B Workhorse 53-4347
 PZL-Mielec Lim-2
 PZL-Mielec Lim-6
 Republic F-84C Thunderjet 47-1562
 Royal Aircraft Factory S.E.5 – 7/8 scale replica
 Sikorsky SH-34J Seabat 148002
 SPAD S.XIII – 1/2 scale replica
 Supermarine Spitfire I – replica
 Vought F-8A Crusader

Civilian aircraft 

 Alexander Eaglerock – on loan from the Colorado Aviation Historical Society
 Bleriot XI – replica
 Learjet 25
 Piper J-3 Cub
 Steen Skybolt

See also 
 CAF Rocky Mountain Wing Museum, Grand Junction, CO
 Colorado Aviation Historical Society Denver, CO
 Pueblo Historical Aircraft Society Pueblo Airport, Pueblo, CO
 Peterson Air and Space Museum Peterson AFB, Colorado Springs, CO
 Spirit of Flight Center Lafayette, CO
 Vintage Aero Flying Museum Platte Valley Airpark, Husdon, CO
 Wings Over the Rockies Air and Space Museum Old Lowry AFB Campus, Denver, CO
Related lists
List of aerospace museums

References

External links 

 Pueblo Weisbrod Aircraft Museum

Aerospace museums in Colorado
Buildings and structures in Pueblo, Colorado
Military and war museums in Colorado
Museums in Pueblo County, Colorado
Tourist attractions in Pueblo, Colorado